is a town located in Tokachi Subprefecture, Hokkaido, Japan.

As of September 2016, the town has an estimated population of 4,908 and a density of 7 persons per km2. The total area is 700.87 km2.

Climate
The town has a humid continental climate (Köppen climate classification Dfb, hemiboreal).

Mascot

She is a shy hot air balloon who can both walk on earth or fly in the sky. Because she is a fairy, she had to eat food (especially agricultural and livestock products from the town) that is washed by the waters from the Nukabira Gensenkyo onsen to grow into a size of a human. She was unveiled on 1 December 2008.

Notable people from Kamishihoro
Hanako Tokachi, actress

References

External links

Official Website 

Towns in Hokkaido